Too Close to Home can refer to:

 Too Close to Home (novel), a 2008 novel written by Linwood Barclay
 Too Close to Home (TV series), a 2016 TV series created by Tyler Perry